Mud Slide Slim and the Blue Horizon is the third studio album by American singer-songwriter James Taylor, released in April 1971 by Warner Bros. Records. The album was recorded between early January and late February of the same year.

Release and promotion 
Released in April 1971, the album contains Taylor's biggest hit single in the US, a cover version of the Carole King standard "You've Got a Friend", which hit #1 on the Billboard charts on July 31, 1971, his only song to do so. The week before, the album itself reached its peak position of #2 in the Billboard album charts. It was held off the top spot by King, then ruling the charts with the blockbuster Tapestry album, which contained her version of "You've Got a Friend". The song earned Grammy Awards both for Taylor (Best Pop Vocal Performance, Male) and King (Song of the Year). Mud Slide Slim managed to generate another Top 40 hit, "Long Ago and Far Away", which reached #31 on the Billboard Hot 100. Other songs became standards in concert, particularly "You Can Close Your Eyes".

Critical reception 

Reviewing for Rolling Stone in 1971, Ben Gerson found the album to be a "dull listening" the first few times: "Once the melodies begin to sink in, and the LP's raison d'etre is discovered, the album's subtle tensions begin to appear. And while the album at this point makes for pleasant, absorbing listening, there is a terrible weariness to it which is part of its artistic statement."

Village Voice critic Robert Christgau was more critical of Taylor's songwriting. "Having squandered most of the songs on his big success, he's concentrating on the intricate music", Christgau wrote, finding the lyrics "more onanistic than ever, escapist as a matter of conscious thematic decision. From what? you well may wonder. From success, poor fella. Blues singers lived on the road out of economic necessity, although they often got into it; Taylor is an addict, pure and simple. A born-rich nouveau star who veers between a 'homestead on the farm' (what does he raise there, hopes?) and the Holiday Inn his mean old existential dilemma compels him to call home deserves the conniving, self-pitying voice that is his curse. Interesting, intricate, unlistenable."

In 2000 it was voted number 858 in Colin Larkin's All Time Top 1000 Albums.

Track listing

All songs by James Taylor unless otherwise noted.

Side one
"Love Has Brought Me Around" – 2:41
"You've Got a Friend" (Carole King) – 4:28
"Places in My Past" – 2:01
"Riding on a Railroad" – 2:41
"Soldiers" – 1:13
"Mud Slide Slim" – 5:20

Side two
"Hey Mister, That's Me up on the Jukebox" – 3:46
"You Can Close Your Eyes" – 2:31
"Machine Gun Kelly" (Danny Kortchmar) – 2:37
"Long Ago and Far Away" – 2:20
"Let Me Ride" – 2:42
"Highway Song" – 3:51
"Isn't It Nice to Be Home Again" – 0:55

Personnel
 James Taylor – lead vocals,  backing vocals (1, 2, 6, 9-12), acoustic guitar (1, 2, 4-11, 13), piano (3, 12)
 Danny Kortchmar – electric guitar (1, 6, 11), acoustic guitar (2, 9), guitar (3), congas (9, 10, 11)
 John Hartford – banjo (4)
 Carole King – piano (1, 4-7, 10, 12)
 Kevin Kelly – accordion (3), piano (11)
 Leland Sklar – bass guitar (1-7, 10-12)
 Russ Kunkel – drums (1-7, 9-12), congas (1, 2, 6, 11), cowbell (1), cymbal (1), cabasa (2), tambourine (9)
 Peter Asher – tambourine (1), backing vocals (9, 12)
 Richard Greene – fiddle (4)
 The Memphis Horns – horns and horn arrangements (1, 11)
 Andrew Love – tenor saxophone
 Wayne Jackson – trumpet
 Joni Mitchell – backing vocals (1, 2, 10)
 Kate Taylor – backing vocals (11, 12)

Production
 Producer – Peter Asher
 Engineer – Richard Sanford Orshoff
 Art Direction – Ed Thrasher
 Liner Artwork – Laurie Miller
 Cover Photography – Ethan Russell

Charts

Weekly charts

Year-end charts

Certifications

References

External links 
 

1971 albums
James Taylor albums
Albums produced by Peter Asher
Warner Records albums